Will McRobb and Chris Viscardi are a team of American show-creators, writers and producers of television and screenwriters.

They are best known as the co-creators of the award-winning and critically acclaimed Nickelodeon television series The Adventures of Pete & Pete. Critics have called this quirky and heartfelt ode to growing up "one of the best kids' shows ever".

Los Angeles Times TV critic Robert Lloyd said of the show, "By rendering the ordinary events of childhood and adolescence — staying up late, hating shop class, discovering music, ruing the end of summer — as the epic stuff of legend, the series captured the actual depth and intensity of feeling that comes with being young. Poignant without being sentimental, oddball but never merely weird, the show was made to be 'funny, sad, strange and beautiful'."

The series was also known for its music and special guest stars. Over its 39 episodes, Pete & Pete featured Michael Stipe, Iggy Pop, Debbie Harry, Steve Buscemi, Patricia Hearst and many others. In recent years, the show has returned to its now grown-up audience in the form of cast reunions that have played to sold-out audiences in New York, Los Angeles, San Francisco, Chicago and Portland.

Currently, McRobb is an executive producer of two animated series for children in production for Apple TV+. Harriet the Spy is an adaptation of the coming-of-age novel about a rebellious 11-year-old girl living in New York City in the 1960s, who wants to be a spy and a writer. El Deafo is an adaptation of the Newbery Award-winning graphic novel and memoir. It is a tragicomic chronicle of a young girl who has to learn to overcome her disability when she loses her hearing at age five.

Recent projects include executive-producing Costume Quest, an animated children's series from Amazon which was premiered in 2018. He was also the executive producer and writer of Click, Clack, Moo: Christmas at the Farm, an animated Christmas special based on the popular Click, Clack, Moo children's book series. It was premiered in December 2017. From 2015 to 2017, he was one of the executive producers of Sanjay and Craig, an animated children's show for Nickelodeon.

McRobb was also a writer on the 2007 family movie Alvin and the Chipmunks.

Work

Television

Television movies

Films

Web series

References

External links

American male screenwriters
Place of birth missing (living people)
Year of birth missing (living people)
American television producers
American television writers
Living people
Screenwriting duos
Showrunners
American male television writers
Nickelodeon people